Kristian Gislefoss (born 13 October 1980) is a Norwegian meteorologist and weather presenter.

He was born in Bergen as a son of meteorologist and weather presenter Kristen Gislefoss, but grew up in Bærum after his family moved there. He took his secondary education at Eikeli Upper Secondary School.

In 2011 he became a prime time weather presenter for the Norwegian Broadcasting Corporation. He resides at Eiksmarka.

References

1980 births
Living people
People from Bærum
Norwegian meteorologists
Weather presenters
NRK people